Thomas Joseph Martin is an American television writer. He grew up in Southern California and attended Rolling Hills High School and Indio High School. He graduated from University of California, Irvine in 1987 with degrees in Economics and Political Science. While at UC Irvine he ran on the Track and Cross Country teams. He has written for Saturday Night Live (as a guest writer), The Simpsons, The Naked Truth, Just Shoot Me!, Clone High, WordGirl, and is a former standup comedian. He co-created Talking Tom and Friends, and is currently executive producer on the Clash of Clans inspired series Clash-a-Rama!.

Writing credits

The Simpsons
"Sunday, Cruddy Sunday" (1999, with George Meyer, Brian Scully, and Mike Scully)
"Grift of the Magi" (1999)
"Pokey Mom" (2001)

Talking Tom & Friends (TV series)
 2014 - 2016, first season only

Movies
It's a Very Merry Muppet Christmas Movie (2002, with Jim Lewis)
The Muppets' Wizard of Oz (2005, Screenplay, with Debra Frank, Steve Hayes, and Adam F. Goldberg)

References

External links

Living people
American television writers
American male television writers
Writers from Chicago
University of California, Irvine alumni
Screenwriters from California
Screenwriters from Illinois
Year of birth missing (living people)